Fairyhill may refer to:
 Fairyhill (village), a locality on Gower Peninsula
Fairyhill, Reynoldston, a hotel near Swansea
 Fairyhill (Helsingør), an English-style country house outside Helsingør, Denmark